A Christmas pageant is a public event conducted in celebration of the Christmas holiday, typically involving an entertainment in the form of a procession (such as a  Santa Claus parade), or a Nativity play or other performance.

Nativity pageant roles
Typical roles include:
 Joseph (father of Jesus)
 Mary, mother of Jesus 
 Christ Child 
 Three Wisemen 
 Balthazar 
 Caspar
 Melchior 
 Caesar Augustus 
 Roman soldier 
 Heralding Angels 
 Angels 
 Shepherds 
 Donkey 
 Calves 
 Sheep

Christmas parades 

The Santa Claus Parade may also be known as the Thanksgiving Day Parade which is held on Thanksgiving yearly. This parade usually includes floats, marching bands, performances of various artists and of course, Santa Claus himself.

See also
 Adelaide Christmas Pageant
 List of holiday parades

References

Pageant